25I-NBF (2C-I-NBF, NBF-2C-I, Cimbi-21) is a derivative of the phenethylamine hallucinogen 2C-I, which acts as a highly potent partial agonist for the human 5-HT2A receptor, with bias towards the β-arrestin 2 coupled signalling pathway. It has been studied in its 11C radiolabelled form as a potential ligand for mapping the distribution of 5-HT2A receptors in the brain, using positron emission tomography (PET).

Legality
25I-NBF is illegal in Hungary, Japan, Latvia, and Vermont.

Sweden
The Riksdag added 25I-NBF to Narcotic Drugs Punishments Act under Swedish schedule I ("substances, plant materials and fungi which normally do not have medical use") as of January 26, 2016, published by Medical Products Agency (MPA) in regulation HSLF-FS 2015:35 listed as 25I-NBF, and 2-(4-jodo-2,5-dimetoxifenyl)-N-(2-fluorobensyl)etanamin.

United Kingdom

Analogues and derivatives

References 

25-NB (psychedelics)
Designer drugs
Fluoroarenes
Iodoarenes